Agustín Calleri was the defending champion but lost in the first round to Luis Horna.

Carlos Moyá won in the final 6–3, 6–0 against Fernando Verdasco.

Seeds
A champion seed is indicated in bold text while text in italics indicates the round in which that seed was eliminated.

  Carlos Moyá (champion)
  Nicolás Massú (quarterfinals)
  Agustín Calleri (first round)
  Mariano Zabaleta (second round)
  Félix Mantilla Botella (second round)
  Gastón Gaudio (second round)
  Juan Ignacio Chela (semifinals)
  Filippo Volandri (quarterfinals)

Draw

References
 2004 Abierto Mexicano Telefonica Movistar Draw

2004 Abierto Mexicano Telcel
Singles